Jason Walton (born 13 June 1990) is an English rugby league footballer who plays as a  forward or  for the Dewsbury Rams in the Betfred Championship.

Background
Walton was born in Leeds, West Yorkshire, England.

Career
His first professional club was also Salford Red Devils then known as Salford City Reds, playing five matches from the bench before joining Batley Bulldogs making over 100 appearances. He would rejoin Salford Red Devils for the 2014 season along with fellow Batley Bulldog Greg Johnson making 21 appearances until joining London Broncos on a deal until the end of 2016. He was released by London and signed a one-year deal with Wakefield Trinity Wildcats in December 2015.

Walton appeared for England Under-17s against the Australian Institute of Sport in 2007.

Featherstone Rovers
Walton signed a two-year Deal with RFL Championship side the Bradford Bulls. However Bradford were liquidated before the start of the 2017 season. Walton then signed with Featherstone Rovers.

References

External links
Featherstone Rovers profile
 Sky Sports Profile
 

1990 births
Living people
Batley Bulldogs players
Dewsbury Rams players
English rugby league players
Featherstone Rovers players
London Broncos players
Rugby league centres
Rugby league players from Leeds
Salford Red Devils players
Wakefield Trinity players